Marina 1 is a cluster of six residential buildings in Dubai Marina in Dubai, United Arab Emirates.  Marina 1 was the first phase, and first completed buildings, in Dubai Marina.  Because of that, these buildings have become a symbol for Dubai Marina.  The complex contains 1100 units, which were all sold out shortly after going on sale in 2002.

Towers
The complex consists of six buildings:

See also
List of tallest buildings in Dubai
 List of buildings in Dubai

References

External links

Marina 1 on Emporis

Residential buildings completed in 2003
Residential skyscrapers in Dubai
High-tech architecture
Postmodern architecture
\